Karasai Stadium (Karasaı stadıony), previously known as Avangard Stadium, is a multi-use stadium in Petropavl, Kazakhstan.  It is currently used mostly for football matches and is the home stadium of FC Kyzylzhar.

References

Football venues in Kazakhstan
FC Kyzylzhar